Matthew James Shively Jr. (born September 15, 1990) is an American actor best known for his role as Ryan Laserbeam on the Nickelodeon television series True Jackson, VP. Beginning in June 2011, he began appearing on two more Nickelodeon shows: Winx Club as Sky and The Troop as Kirby. He co-starred in the ABC television program The Real O'Neals which debuted on March 8, 2016.

Early life
Shively was born in Hanford, California. He became interested in acting in the fourth grade after seeing Shia LaBeouf on the television program Even Stevens, and LaBeouf remains his inspiration for acting. He has been a long-time fan of the Canadian television show Degrassi: The Next Generation. He also had a band with his good friend Sterling Knight named Connecting Channels.

Career
Shively had a minor part in the 2007 film Rattle Basket, and another small part on an episode of Zoey 101. He auditioned several times for the part of Ryan on True Jackson, VP, and was told he didn't get it. He was called back two weeks later, tested for the role, and won the part. The show received positive reviews. He voiced Crown Prince Sky on Nickelodeon's Winx Club and in two movies based on the series: Winx Club: The Secret of the Lost Kingdom and Winx Club 3D: Magical Adventure. Shively joined the cast of The Troop in its second (and final) season as the character Kirby Bancroft-Cadworth III.

Shively's film career began in 2011, when he was cast in a minor role in the horror comedy April Apocalypse. Shively played one of the leads in the horror film Paranormal Activity 4. The film was released October 18, 2012. Justin Lowe, writing for the Associated Press, called Shively "likable enough", while generally panning the film. Rafer Guzman of Newsday agreed. Andy Webster of the New York Times found Shively's performance "delightful" and generally praised the picture. Shively co-starred in the comedy Noobz, which was released in theaters in late January 2013. He played one of four geeky friends who attempt to win a video gaming contest.

Shively also appeared the independent feature film Bucky and the Squirrels, a 2014 mockumentary directed by Allan Katz about a wacky 1960s psychedelic rock band whose airplane crashes in snowy mountains. Frozen alive, the band is thawed out in the 21st century. Shively also had a leading role in the 2014 film Expelled as the main character's best friend, Danny.

Shively co-starred in the ABC television program The Real O'Neals, which debuted on March 2, 2016. Shively portrayed 17-year-old Jimmy O'Neal. Shively won significant praise from reviewer Sheri Linden for his performance in the 2016 coming-of-age film Summer of 8, and teamed with fellow former Nickelodeon star Jennette McCurdy in the short horror-comedy film 8 Bodies in 2017.

Personal life
Matt Shively has been in a relationship with Ashley Newbrough since 2017.

Filmography

Films

Television

References

External links
 
 "Matt Shively Talks About His New Show, True Jackson, VP." Blogcritics.com. October 19, 2008.

1990 births
21st-century American male actors
Male actors from California
American male child actors
American male film actors
American male television actors
Living people
People from Hanford, California